Stultification (from Latin stultus stupid) refers to the state of being or a situation or an action causing one to become
 stupid or
 foolish or
 unsound

The silent implication of stultification in neurobiological terms is that certain external influences can have a lasting neural effect (reduction of the number of synapses, reduced number of interconnections between brain areas, less efficient signal transmission etc.). Such effects are studied by biopsychology and psychosomatic medicine.

See also
 Dementia
 DSM-5
 Is Google Making Us Stupid?
 Moron

Behavioral neuroscience